Michael Lückner is a German musician, notable for his projects "Guitar", "Computerjockeys" and "Digital Jockey".

History 
Sunkissed, Lückner's first album under the Guitar moniker was released in 2001 and was "well-received". Its sound drew comparisons to My Bloody Valentine's album Loveless.

Honeysky from 2004 was initially only released in Japan, where Lückner lived.

Tokyo (2006) was inspired by the instruments Lückner encountered during his in Japan and features koto and pipa guitars, two guitars of the Japanese music tradition.

Discography 
 Computerjockeys: Computerjockeys (1999, Harvest/EMI Electrola)
 Digital Jockey: 8 Studies in Dub considering global welfare as well as international charity stamps and letters (2000)
 Computerjockeys: Plankton (2001, Island Records/Universal)
 Guitar: Sunkissed (2001, Morr Music)
 Digital Jockey: Paradies und Fragment - Neun Studien in klassischer Musik (2002, Poets Club Records)
 Guitar: Honeysky (2004, Third-Ear Japan, re-released by Tonevendor USA)
 Digital Jockey: Codeine Dub (2005, Poets Club Records)
 Guitar: Saltykisses (2006, Third-Ear Japan, re-released by Tonevendor USA)
 Guitar: Tokyo (2006) 
 Guitar: Dealin with Signal and Noise (2007)
 Guitar: Friends (2009, And Records Japan)
 Guitar: It's Sweet to Do Nothing! (2011, Tonevendor USA)
 Guitar: The House of the Hapless Hearts (2014, Bandcamp USA)

References

Living people
German male musicians
Year of birth missing (living people)